Common Management Admission Test (CMAT) is an online computer-based test conducted by the National Testing Agency (NTA), India. It is a national-level admission test for facilitating institutions to select suitable students for admission in all management programmes approved by AICTE.

The first edition of CMAT was conducted in 2012. 
In 2014, the first CMAT was conducted between 20 February and 24 February. Around 1.2 Lakh Candidates participated in the test. The Results were declared on 14 March 2014.

History 
By 2011, there were a number of entrance exams for management programmes in India. These included CAT, JMET, XAT, Gitam SAT, NMAT, SNAP, MAT, state-specific exams, exams conducted by management associations of MBA institutes and exams conducted by private colleges. AICTE launched CMAT to reduce the burden (physical, mental and financial stress) of students in attending to multiple examinations.

Till 2015, CMAT was held twice in a year but last year the practice was abolished as AICTE decided to hold the exam once a year on the third Sunday of January.

Some of leading Business Schools have decided to keep out from CMAT, the reason given was "late announcement" by AICTE. But still quite a number of colleges accept their score.

Format 

CMAT is a three-hour test. In 2012, it was conducted in a period of nine days (20–28 February) in two shifts at 61 locations in all over India.

The better of two scores will be used for admission for 2014-15

The question paper comprises four sections:
 Quantitative technique
 Logical reasoning
 Language comprehension
 General Awareness

There are 25 questions in each section. While each correct answer carries four marks, each wrong answer will carry one negative marking.

AICTE has now decided to conduct CMAT in Foreign Countries for facilitating eligible NRIs/PIOs and foreign nationals to appear in CMAT for seeking admission in institutions in India following CMAT merit list for 2014-15 under special provisions defined in AICTE Approval Process and against all vacancies left after completion of centralized admission in management institutions.

CMAT Eligibility
    
AICTE has certified the qualification criteria to appear for CMAT, which must be fulfilled by every one of the applicants interested in taking this test. It must be guaranteed that the applicants must fulfill the qualification conditions of CMAT, before filling the application form. Non-fulfillment of the same may lead to disqualification of the candidate regardless of the stage of admission an applicant will be. The qualification standards are as under:
 The candidate should be an Indian citizen and can apply for the test irrespective of his or her age.
 He/she should have a Graduation degree in any discipline from a recognized University or Institute.
 Additionally, last year pursuing students of Graduate courses whose results will be announced before beginning of admissions for the academic year 2017-18 were also qualified to apply.
 No age limitation.
 Graduates with 50% in any discipline
 Final year students of Graduate Courses can also apply

CMAT in other countries
CMAT is also conducted by the Tribhuvan University of Nepal in compulsion to get admission in management faculty of the university. The students are required to obtain at least 40 marks to attend the classes of Bachelor in Business Administration (BBA), Bachelor in Information Management (BIM), Bachelor in Business Management (BBM), Bachelor in Hotel Management (BHM), Bachelor in Travel and Tourism Management (BTTM).

See also

 Public service commissions in India

References

External links 
 Official CMAT website
 CMAT Course Preparation Site in Nepal

Standardised tests in India
Management education in India
2012 establishments in India